Hanumana is a town and a nagar panchayat in Rewa district in the Indian state of Madhya Pradesh and some Neighbouring Towns are Manikwar , Mauganj And Mangawan. There is a famous temple of Lord Shiva known as Hateshwarnath located in Village Hata. People of Hanumana started migrating to big cities like Indore, Bhopal, Mumbai and Delhi for education and jobs. The main income source of adjacent villages are farming.

Chairman Of Indian Redcross Society Is Raghunath Singh Tendua

Demographics
 India census, Hanumana had a population of 14,873. Males constitute 52% of the population and females 48%. Hanumana has an average literacy rate of 53%, lower than the national average of 59.5%: male literacy is 64%, and female literacy is 41%. In Hanumana, 19% of the population is under 6 years of age.

After the year 2000, Hanumana became an education hub for nearby villages however its business hub image went down drastically as all villages now have their own marketplace. Now many people from nearby villages come to Hanumana to pursue an education. Students pursue technical education like medical, Engineering , MBA and more  migrate to other cities within and out of Madhya Pradesh.

Landmarks in the town include a waterfall called Kurwa and a 150-year-old temple, Hanuman Temple. A myth about the temple is that lord Hanuman was born there. The festivals Diwali, Dashra, Rakhi and Holi are widely celebrated.

Transport

By air

Nearest airport is Rewa Airport in Rewa, Madhya Pradesh.

By bus

Bus stand available in the city bus stand.

References

Cities and towns in Rewa district
Rewa, Madhya Pradesh